Rohan Oza is an American businessman, investor, and marketing expert behind several large brands. Rohan has been a recurring guest on the television show Shark Tank.

Early life 
Oza was born in Zambia in an ethnic Indian family. He studied at Harrow School.

Oza went on to study manufacturing and industrial engineering at Nottingham University. He pivoted to marketing and corporate strategy while at the University of Michigan, where he received his MBA.

Career
Oza began his career in the town of Slough as the manufacturing manager behind Mars' M&M's.

Oza got his start in marketing by advertising Snickers for Mars, Incorporated in Europe. He later was hired as a marketing manager for The Coca-Cola Company.

He has been credited for revitalizing the Sprite brand by signing Kobe Bryant as a spokesperson. Oza also worked with Andy Roddick, Michael Vick, Tom Brady, LeBron James, Jennifer Aniston, Gal Gadot, 50 Cent, Ne-Yo, Rihanna and Madonna as celebrity endorsements.

He left Coca-Cola in 2002 to join Glacéau, most famous for their Vitaminwater brand. In 2007, Coca-Cola purchased Glacéau in an acquisition for $4.2 billion, expanding the company's non-carbonated portfolio. Rohan was appointed Chief Marketing Officer of Coke's still brands, where he stayed until 2009.

As an investor, Oza made an early bet alongside Justin Timberlake on Bai Brands and helped persuade the Dr Pepper Snapple Group to buy the company for $1.7 billion. Additionally, he has backed Smartwater, Bulletproof Coffee and Health-Ade Kombucha.

Oza has also been a recurring guest “shark” for ABC’s Shark Tank. He serves as an advisor to Impact Network, a non-profit organization bringing quality education to rural Zambians.

References

Living people
1972 births
American investors
Ross School of Business alumni
People from Livingstone, Zambia
Alumni of the University of Nottingham